Oxton railway station served the village of Oxton, Scottish Borders, Scotland, from 1901 to 1958 on the Lauder Light Railway.

History 
The station opened on 2 July 1901 by the Lauder Light Railway. It was situated on the south side of Station Road. On the down platform was the station building. There was no goods shed in the goods yard; a grounded train carriage was used to store goods instead. A ground frame was also here. A siding served a cattle dock behind the down platform. A goods shed was built eventually but after the station closed to passengers on 12 September 1932. It still remained open to goods traffic. In March 1954, the station was downgraded to a public delivery siding. It closed to goods on 1 October 1958.

References

External links 

Disused railway stations in the Scottish Borders
Railway stations in Great Britain opened in 1901
Railway stations in Great Britain closed in 1932
1901 establishments in Scotland
1958 disestablishments in Scotland